The 1939 Appalachian State Mountaineers football team was an American football team that represented Appalachian State Teachers College (now known as Appalachian State University) as a member of the North State Conference during the 1939 college football season. In their first year under head coach Flucie Stewart, the Mountaineers compiled an overall record of 7–1–2, with a mark of 3–0–1 in conference play, and finished as NSC co-champion.

Schedule

References

Appalachian State
Appalachian State Mountaineers football seasons
Appalachian State Mountaineers football